Nathaniel Taylor may refer to:

People
 Nathaniel William Taylor (1786–1858), American Protestant theologian
 Nathaniel Taylor (general) (c. 1771–c. 1816), American general in the War of 1812, builder of Sabine Hill and grandfather of Nathaniel Green Taylor
 Nathaniel Green Taylor (1819–1887), U.S. Representative from Tennessee
 Kenneth N. Taylor (1917–2005), American publisher and author, creator of The Living Bible, founder of Tyndale House
 Nathaniel Taylor (actor) (1938-2019), American television actor
 Nathaniel Taylor (artist) (born 1969), American sculptor

Ship
 USS Nathaniel Taylor (1863), American Union steamer

See also
 Nathan Taylor (disambiguation)

Taylor, Nathaniel